Joseph Katebian (born 9 November 1995) is an Australian football (soccer) player who plays as a forward for Avondale in the NPL Victoria.

Early life
Katebian was born in Melbourne on 9 November 1995, to Lebanese Australian parents of distant Armenian origin. Katebian played football from a young age for local club Bulleen Lions where he would later play for the senior squad. Katebian also played for Ivanhoe Grammar School's first eleven in his later years of high school, where he graduated in 2013.

Club career

Youth career
Katebian spent his early years playing for FC Bulleen Lions in Melbourne's eastern suburbs, before joining Melbourne Heart Youth for the 2013–14 season. At the season's end, Katebian joined cross-town rivals Melbourne Victory, that he later captained in the National Premier Leagues Victoria,  where he won the league's 2015 player's player of the year and golden boot awards. Katebian featured in the starting eleven that defeated North Geelong Warriors on 26 September 2015, which promoted Melbourne Victory NPL Youth to the highest level of the National Premier Leagues Victoria.

Melbourne Victory
Katebian made his official competitive debut for the Melbourne Victory senior squad on 1 September 2015, in the 2015 FFA Cup round of 16 clash against Rockdale City Suns, coming on as a substitute in the 85th minute for Archie Thompson. His A-League debut came two months later on 19 November 2015, in the round five clash against Central Coast Mariners, substituted on for Gui Finkler in the 90th minute of the 2–1 victory at AAMI Park. On 31 May 2016, Katebian departed Melbourne Victory to pursue football opportunities abroad.

In June 2016, he went to Serbia for trials at FK Čukarički.

Brisbane Roar
On 5 August 2016, Katebian signed a one-year contract with Brisbane Roar, reuniting with John Aloisi who coached him at Melbourne Victory Youth. After managing just 27 minutes of A-League football, Katebian was released by the Roar.

Avondale FC 
On 1 November 2017, it was announced that Katebian had joined Avondale FC.

Career statistics

Honours
With Melbourne Victory Youth:
 National Premier Leagues Victoria 1 Playoff Promotion Winners: 2015

Individual
 Melbourne Victory Youth Player's Player of the year: 2015
 Melbourne Victory Youth Youth medal: 2016
 National Premier Leagues Victoria 1 Player's Player of the year: 2015
 National Premier Leagues Victoria 1 Golden Boot: 2015
 National Youth League Golden Boot: 2015–16

References

External links

Living people
1995 births
Association football forwards
A-League Men players
Melbourne Victory FC players
Brisbane Roar FC players
Soccer players from Melbourne
National Premier Leagues players
Australian people of Lebanese descent
Australian people of Armenian descent
Australian soccer players
Sportspeople of Lebanese descent
People educated at Ivanhoe Grammar School